Uea is a high rocky offshore island of Rotuma. Uea is one of a number of outliers lying off the west coast of Rotuma.

The endemic bird Rotuma myzomela (Myzomela chermesina) is found only on the main island of Rotuma and Uea.

The geological features and the beach forests of the island contribute to its national significance as outlined in Fiji's Biodiversity Strategy and Action Plan.

References

Rotuma
Preliminary Register of Sites of National Significance in Fiji